Mike De Palmer and Gary Donnelly were the defending champions, but Donnelly did not participate this year.  De Palmer partnered Paul Annacone, losing in the quarterfinals.

Broderick Dyke and Tom Nijssen won the title, defeating Sammy Giammalva Jr. and Jim Grabb 6–3, 6–2 in the final.

Seeds

  Robert Seguso /  Slobodan Živojinović (semifinals)
  Paul Annacone /  Mike De Palmer (quarterfinals)
  Rick Leach /  Tim Pawsat (first round)
  Boris Becker /  Eric Jelen (quarterfinals, withdrew)

Draw

Draw

External links
Draw

1987 Grand Prix (tennis)
Tokyo Indoor